James Blake was the defending champion, but chose not to participate that year.

Dmitry Tursunov won in the final 6–2, 6–1, against Benjamin Becker.

Seeds

Draw

Finals

Top half

Bottom half

External links
Draw
Qualifying Draw

Singles